Johnsfield is a settlement near Lockerbie in Dumfries and Galloway, Scotland.

External links
 Scotland's places

Villages in Dumfries and Galloway